Broken Law (previously entitled Let Your Guard Down and The Broken Law of Attraction) is a 2020 Irish crime drama film directed by short film maker Paddy Slattery. It stars Tristan Heanue, John Connors and Gemma-Leah Devereux. It was the result of a crowd-funding initiative from Slattery. It premiered at the Dublin International Film Festival in 2020, with Slattery winning an Aer Lingus Discovery Award for his work.

Plot 
Dave Connolly is a respected member of the Garda Síochána but his loyalty to the law gets tested by his ex-convict brother Joe who is in desperate need of his help.

Cast 

 Tristan Heanue as Dave Connolly, a garda (policeman) in Dublin
 Graham Earley as Joe Connolly, Dave's brother
 John Connors as Wallace, a friend of Joe's
 Gemma-Leah Devereux as Amia McNamara, a credit union employee and Dave's love interest
 Ally Ní Charáin as Irene Connolly, mother of Dave and Joe 
 Ryan Lincoln as Pete, a friend of Wallace

References

External links
 
 

2020 films
2020s crime comedy-drama films
Films about drugs
Films set in Dublin (city)
Irish crime comedy-drama films
2020s English-language films
2020 crime films
2020 comedy-drama films
English-language Irish films